Meherjaan is the feature-length début film of Bangladeshi director Rubaiyat Hossain. The film was pulled from theatres due to the hostile response of some segments of the audience after its release in January 2011. Meherjaan claims to be a women's "feminine" re-visiting of the Bangladesh Independence War with Pakistan in 1971, while many feel discomfort with the deconstructive representation of the '71 conflict.

Cast
 Jaya Bachchan as Meher
 Victor Banerjee as Khwaja Saheb (Grandfather)
 Omar Rahim as Wasim Khan (Pakistani Soldier)
 Shaina Amin as Young Meher
 Reetu A Sattar as Neela (Birangona/Freedom fighter)
 Azad Abul Kalam Pavel as Shumon (Communist Party worker)
 Humayun Faridi as Khonker (Razakar)
 Sharmili Ahmed as Meher's Mother
 Khairul Alam Sabuj as Meher's Father
 Monira Mithu as Meher's Aunt
 Nasima Selim as Sarah (Warchild)
 Rubaiyat Hossain as Salma
 Ashique Mostafa as Shimul (Freedom fighter)
 Shatabdi Wadud as Khalil
 Iqbal Sultan as Major Baset (Pakistani Major)
 Rifat Chowdhury as Arup
 Arup Rahee as Rahee
 Rajeev Ahmed as Sami
 Tansina Shawan as Joba (Freedom Fighter)

Festivals and awards

Meherjaan has been participated in many film festivals including Kolkata Film Festival, Festival International de Films de Fribourg, Festival de Cine de Bogotá,Festival Cinematográfico Internacional del Uruguay, London Asian Film Festival, Osian's Cinefan Festival of Asian & Arab Cinema.

Meherjaan wins a handful of awards at International film festivals and competitions including Best Critic Award (Jaipur International Film Festival), Jury Award and Audience Award (Northampton International Film Festival), Orson Welles Award (Tiburon International Film Festival)

Suspension

The film was withdrawn from movie theatres in Bangladesh due to the objections of different groups of people. "The film Meherjaan, which was released in Dhaka in January 2011, was quickly pulled out of theatres after it created a furore among audiences. The hostile responses to the film from across generations highlight the discomfort about the portrayal of a raped woman, and its depiction of female and multiple sexualities during the Bangladesh Liberation War of 1971.  The film's stance against Bangladeshi nationalism also created a stir among audiences."

On 3 November 2011, there was a special film event and a panel discussion at Harvard University sponsored by the  University of Massachusetts Boston, South Asia Initiative at Harvard University, Consortium on Gender, Security and Human Rights at UMass, and the CARR Center for Human Rights, Harvard Kennedy School. The film was screened in advance of a panel discussion by Cambridge/Boston academics.

Reviews
Meherjaan has received mixed reviews.

References

External links
 
 

2011 films
Bengali-language Bangladeshi films
Bangladeshi war drama films
Films set in the 1970s
Films based on the Bangladesh Liberation War
Film controversies in Bangladesh